The Energi Danmark Champions Battle is a one-night tennis exhibition held each November since 2014. The event is held at the Jyske Bank Boxen in Herning, Denmark. In first two editions matches were played in front of a sold-out crowd of 7,000.

The event format is a women's singles match and men's doubles match played with active players. In singles, they compete in a best-of-three set match with regular scoring, which means ad scoring is included. In doubles, rules are as of a regular doubles match, meaning when it's one-set all Super-Tie Break is played, and scoring is no-ad.

Caroline Wozniacki, the winner of second edition in 2015, received a Shamballa bracelet worth 100,000 Danish krones (just over $14,000).

List of Winners

References

Exhibition tennis tournaments
Tennis tournaments in Denmark
Recurring sporting events established in 2014
Herning Municipality